Ralph Ellis may refer to:

 Ralph Ellis (painter) (1885–1963), English painter and designer of inn signs
 Ralph W. Ellis (1856–1945), American lawyer, banker and politician
 Ralph Ellis (musician), member of British band The Swinging Blue Jeans